Protaetia cuprea, also known as the copper chafer, is a species of chafer in the family Scarabaeidae. This species is also known as the rose chafer, and has a wide geographic distribution extending from Canary Islands, Portugal and Spain in the west towards Vladivostok in the Russian Far East, Mongolia, and northern China. This species forages for pollen from flowers and fruits, such as apples, from trees. However, since fruit is scarce in the spring and winter, they only transition from a diet of pollen to a diet of fruits in the summer.  Since pollen is more rich in proteins and lipids than carbohydrates, and fruit is more rich in carbohydrates, they are able to travel longer when on a fruit diet. This is due to their increased aerobic performance when fueled by carbohydrate rich content.

Taxonomy 
Protaetia cuprea contains the following subspecies:

Protaetia cuprea subsp. adelheid Mitter, 2017
Protaetia cuprea subsp. alainilerestifi (Montreuil & Legrand, 2010)
Protaetia cuprea subsp. algerica Motschulsky, 1849
Protaetia cuprea subsp. bourgini Ruter, 1967
Protaetia cuprea subsp. brancoi Baraud, 1992
Protaetia cuprea subsp. cuprea
Protaetia cuprea subsp. daurica (Motschulsky, 1860)
Protaetia cuprea subsp. ferreriesensis (Compte-Sart & Carreras-Torrent, 2013)
Protaetia cuprea subsp. hesperica (Motschulsky, 1849)
Protaetia cuprea subsp. hypocrita (Ragusa, 1905)
Protaetia cuprea subsp. ignicollis (Gory & Percheron, 1833)
Protaetia cuprea subsp. ikonomovi (Miksic, 1958)
Protaetia cuprea subsp. levantina (Schatzmayr, 1936)
Protaetia cuprea subsp. mehrabii (Montreuil & Legrand, 2008)
Protaetia cuprea subsp. metallica (Herbst, 1782)
Protaetia cuprea subsp. obscura (Andersch, 1797)
Protaetia cuprea subsp. olivacea (Mulsant, 1842)
Protaetia cuprea subsp. viridiaurata (Fuente, 1897)
Protaetia cuprea subsp. volhyniensis (Gory & Percheron, 1833)

References

Scarabaeidae
Beetles described in 1775
Taxa named by Johan Christian Fabricius